Frikjent ("Acquitted") is a 2015 Norwegian TV series. In the UK, the series is shown on Walter Presents.

Content
In season one, Aksel Nilsen (Nicolai Cleve Broch) was tried 20 years ago for the murder of 18-year-old ex-girlfriend Karine Hansteen. Although he was first convicted for the crime, he was acquitted later following a decisive witness testimony from his childhood friend, Tonje Sandvik (Synnøve Macody Lund). Branded, he disappears from his home town Lifjord in Norway and makes his career in Asia. He lives with his wife Angeline and his son as a successful businessman in Kuala Lumpur.

One day he receives a phone call from William Hansteen, father of Karine, who asks him for an investment in the financially troubled solar panel company in Lifjord. Aksel flies to Norway, where old feuds flare up and Eva Hansteen, mother of Karine and CEO of the company, fights him fiercely and convinces the police officer of the town to re-investigate the murder of Karine. This eventually leads to significant revelations regarding the night of the crime and the role of someone else in the murder.

In season two, after an outrageous confession, William Hansteen is brought to trial for the murder of Karine. Aksel hopes that the truth will come to light and that he will finally be washed clean of the old suspicion. Although he receives support from prosecutor Amina Sahir, he once again finds Eva Hansteen in his way, who uses every means to protect her husband from imprisonment.
When another girl dies, the investigation again focuses on the Nilsen family and Aksel's brother Erik is arrested. Alone, Aksel now also has to free his brother from suspicion.

Cast
 Nicolai Cleve Broch as Aksel (Nilsen) Borgen
 Lena Endre as Eva Hansteen
 Ingar Helge Gimle as William Hansteen
 Anne Marit Jacobsen as Mai-Britt Nilsen
 Tobias Santelmann as Erik Nilsen
 Synnøve Macody Lund as Tonje Sandvik
 Elaine Tan as Angeline Borgen
 Fridtjov Såheim as Svein Eriksen
 Henrik Rafaelsen as Lars Hansteen
 Ellen Dorrit Petersen as Inger Moen Hansteen
 Susanne Boucher as Helene Hansteen
 Mathias Romano as Tim Borgen
Amrita Acharia as Amina Sahir

References

2010s Norwegian television series
2015 Norwegian television series debuts
Norwegian crime television series
Norwegian drama television series